The Suicide of Saul is an oil-on-panel by the Netherlandish Renaissance artist Pieter Bruegel the Elder, painted in 1562. It is in the collection of the Kunsthistorisches Museum in Vienna.

Description
An inscription on the painting identifies the subject as the rarely represented scene of the suicide of Saul after his defeat by the Philistines. These events are described in 1 Samuel 31, 1-5: 

Bruegel has chosen the highly dramatic moment of the death of the armourbearer, just as the Philistines are approaching. See 1st detail

Saul's death was interpreted as a punishment of pride - it was among the proud that Dante met Saul in the Purgatorio - and this may account for Bruegel's choice of such an unusual subject.

As with most of his subjects taken from the Bible, Bruegel treats Saul's suicide as a contemporary event, showing the armies in 16th century armour. In 1529 the German painter Albrecht Altdorfer had shown the clash of the forces of Alexander the Great and Darius at the Battle of the Issus in this way, and in many other respects, too, Bruegel is in Altdorfer's debt, particularly in the representation of the tiny, massed figures of the soldiers and their forests of lances. Bruegel may also have looked at the battle-scenes of another German painter, Jörg Breu the Younger, and at a now lost battle-scene by the Antwerp landscape painter Joachim Patinir which is mentioned by biographer Karel van Mander.

The Suicide of Saul is an early attempt by Bruegel to reconcile landscape and figure painting. If it is compared with one of his latest works, The Magpie on the Gallows of 1568, its weaknesses are apparent: the foreground and background are not yet reconciled and the jutting outcrop of rock in the centre see 2nd detail is a mannerist device which one may see again in The Procession to Calvary. However, the distant landscape is seen through a shimmering haze, which seems to have the effect of emphasizing the foreground detail, and this does represent a new stage in the evolution of Bruegel's depiction of naturalistic landscape.

References

External links

The Suicide of Saul at the KHM (German)
Kunsthistorisches Museum's Official Website
Bosch Bruegel Society
99 works by Pieter Bruegel the Elder
 Creative Bruegel laid the foundation of the Netherlands School (Russian)

1562 paintings
Paintings by Pieter Bruegel the Elder
Paintings in the collection of the Kunsthistorisches Museum
Paintings about suicide
Christian art about death
Paintings depicting Hebrew Bible people
Books of Samuel